End on End is a compilation album by American punk rock band Rites of Spring. It was released in 1991 on Dischord. The album consists of the group's first album Rites of Spring and its EP All Through a Life, along with an extra studio track.

Track listing
All songs written by Rites of Spring.

"Spring" – 2:32
"Deeper than Inside" – 2:16
"For Want Of" – 2:58
"Hain's Point" – 1:53
"All There Is" – 2:00
"Drink Deep" – 2:23
"Other Way Around" – 3:11
"Theme" – 2:11
"By Design" – 2:11
"Remainder" – 2:31
"Persistent Vision" – 2:37
"Nudes" – 2:32
"End on End" – 7:36
"All Through a Life" – 2:27
"Hidden Wheel" – 2:31
"In Silence/Words Away" – 3:00
"Patience" – 1:58

Track 7 was first released on a 1987 re-issue of Rites of Spring.
Tracks 14-17 were originally released as the out-of-print All Through a Life EP, Dischord #22, recorded in January 1986, released in May 1987.

Personnel
Rites of Spring:
Guy Picciotto - vocals, guitar
Eddie Janney - guitar
Mike Fellows - bass guitar
Brendan Canty - drums
Ian MacKaye - producer
Michael Hampton - producer
Silver Sonya - 2001 Remastering

References

External links 

Rites of Spring albums
1991 compilation albums